Boubacar Diarra is the name of two Malian footballers:

 Boubacar Diarra (footballer, born 1979), retired footballer who last played for Liaoning Whowin
 Boubacar Diarra (footballer, born 1994), current footballer who plays for Neroca F.C.

See also
Boubakary Diarra (born 1993), French-born footballer who has represented Mali at youth level